UNCG Wrestling was an NCAA Division I wrestling program at the University of North Carolina at Greensboro.

Athletic Director Kim Record announced on March 14, 2011 her intentions to cut the program,
 saying that the $308,000 to run the program can be better invested in other programs.

The two former coaches, Jason Loukides
 and Daren Burns
 are now running Y.E.S. Wrestling a non-profit wrestling club to provide high level wrestling instruction and competition while also promoting the importance of academic success.

References

 
Sports clubs disestablished in 2011
2011 disestablishments in North Carolina